Miquel Danny Darson (born 27 May 1993) is a Surinamese international footballer who plays as a right back for SVB Topklasse side Inter Moengotapoe.

International career
Darson was part of the Suriname squad that won the 2013 ABCS Tournament. He was called up again in 2015 for a World Cup qualifying games against Nicaragua and the 2015 ABCS Tournament however he failed to feature in any games in 2015.

In 2016, Darson was recalled to the Suriname squad for the fifth place playoff of 2017 Caribbean Cup qualification. He featured in both games as Suriname shocked Trinidad and Tobago by beating them 2–1, and then in the 4–2 defeat to Haiti, which left Suriname unable to qualify for the 2017 CONCACAF Gold Cup.

Career statistics

International

References

External links
 
 Miquel Darson at caribbeanfootballdatabase.com

1993 births
Living people
Surinamese footballers
Suriname international footballers
Association football defenders
S.V. Transvaal players
S.V. Notch players
Inter Moengotapoe players
Sportspeople from Paramaribo
Suriname under-20 international footballers